Trip Hazard: My Great British Adventure is a travel documentary hosted by comedian Rosie Jones for Channel 4 in 2021. The concept of the show is that Jones travels to various locations in the UK alongside a guest star, and the first series of four episodes aired on 9 March 2021.

The guest stars and locations are Scarlett Moffatt (the Lake District), Joe Wilkinson (Whitby), Jamali Maddix (Norwich), and Jenny Eclair (Anglesey). 

The show is narrated by Olivia Colman. Jones described the concept of the show as travelling to places that "aren’t necessarily holiday locations [...] and [yet] finding the best out of that place. It’s full of adventure and positivity, and it’s making the most of this amazing, beautiful country [United Kingdom] we live in." 

In March 2022, Trip Hazard was renewed for a second series by Channel 4 and premiered on 23 August 2022.

Episodes

Series 1 (2021)

Series 2 (2022)

Production information 
Rosie Jones said of the decision to have Olivia Colman narrate the show:

References

External links 
 Trip Hazard: My Great British Adventure - All 4

2021 British television series debuts
2020s British travel television series
Channel 4 documentary series
Channel 4 original programming
English-language television shows